Rhonda Bryers (1952-2007) was a New Zealand singer of Maori descent. At one stage she was regarded as New Zealand's top entertainer.

Background
Bryers was born in Taumarunui to famous Maori rugby player Ron Bryers and Betty. Her first husband was professional wrestler Jock Ruddock.

She achieved a similar level of popularity as Sir Howard Morrison,  John Rowles and Frankie Stevens.

She died in Honolulu in September 2007 of a suspected heart attack. At the time she was suffering from a flu related virus. She was aged 55.

Survived by her two sons Scott and John “Junior John” Ruddock. 3 grandchildren Hohepa, Peatarangi, Ihaia Ruddock

Career
Her version of "Pokarekare Ana" appears on the 1981 CBS various artists album The Mauri Hikitia, which also featured Deane Waretini, Ken Kincaid, the Lightwood family, and the Tri Lites. She migrated to Hawaii and in 1989 she debuted at the Monarch Room of the Royal Hawaiian Hotel. She had a three-week engagement there. She also achieved a good level of fame in Hawaii. Another venue she did well at was the Dole Cannery Ballroom at Iwilei.

Discography

References

1952 births
2007 deaths
New Zealand Māori women singers
20th-century New Zealand women singers